A wall cloud (murus or pedestal cloud) is a large, localized, persistent, and often abrupt lowering of cloud that develops beneath the surrounding base of a cumulonimbus cloud and from which tornadoes sometimes form. It is typically beneath the rain-free base (RFB) portion of a thunderstorm, and indicates the area of the strongest updraft within a storm. Rotating wall clouds are an indication of a mesocyclone in a thunderstorm; most strong tornadoes form from these. Many wall clouds do rotate; however, some do not.

Genesis 

Wall clouds are formed by a process known as entrainment, when an inflow of warm, moist air rises and converges, overpowering wet, rain-cooled air from the normally downwind downdraft. As the warm air continues to entrain the cooler air, the air temperature drops and the dew point increases (thus the dew point depression decreases). As this air continues to rise, it becomes more saturated with moisture, which results in additional cloud condensation, sometimes in the form of a wall cloud. Wall clouds may form as a descending of the cloud base or may form as rising scud comes together and connects to the storm's cloud base.

Structure 
Wall clouds form in the inflow region, on the side of the storm coinciding with the direction of the steering winds (deep layer winds through the height of the storm). In the Northern Hemisphere wall clouds typically form at the south or southwest end of a supercell. This is in the rear of the supercell near the main updraft and most supercells move in a direction with northeasterly components, thus for supercells forming in northwest flow situations and moving southeastward, the wall cloud may be found on the northwest or back side of such storms. Rotating wall clouds are visual evidence of a mesocyclone.

Associated features 

Some wall clouds have a feature similar to an "eye", as in a mesoscale convective vortex.

Attached to many wall clouds, especially in moist environments, is a cauda (tail cloud), a ragged band of cloud and cloud tags (fractus) extending from the wall cloud toward the precipitation core. It can be thought of as an extension of the wall cloud in that not only is the tail cloud connected to the wall cloud but also that condensation forms for a similar reason. Cloud elements may be seen to be moving into the wall cloud, as it is also an inflow feature. Most movement is horizontal, but some rising motion is often apparent as well.

Some wall clouds also have a band of cloud fragments encircling the top of the wall cloud where it meets the ambient cloud base; this feature is a collar cloud.

Another accessory cloud is the flumen, commonly known as the beaver's tail. It is formed by the warm, humid inflow of a strong thunderstorm, and is often mistaken for tornadoes. Although the presence of a flumen is associated with tornado risk, the flumen, similar to scud clouds, does not rotate.

Wall cloud vs. shelf cloud 

Many storms contain shelf clouds, which are often mistaken for wall clouds, since an approaching shelf cloud appears to form a wall made of cloud and may contain turbulent motions. Wall clouds are inflow clouds and tend to slope inward, or toward the precipitation area of a storm. Shelf clouds, on the other hand, are outflow clouds that jut outward from the storm, often as gust fronts. Also, shelf clouds tend to move outward away from the precipitation area of a storm.

Shelf clouds most often appear on the leading edge of a thunderstorm as they are formed by condensation from cool outflow of the storm that lifts warmer air in the ambient environment (at the outflow boundary). When present in a supercell thunderstorm these shelf clouds on the leading edge of a storm are associated with the forward flank downdraft (FFD). Shelf clouds in supercells also form with the rear flank downdraft (RFD), although these tend to be more transitory and smaller than shelf clouds on the forward side of a storm. A wall cloud will usually be at the rear of the storm, though small, rotating wall clouds (a feature of a mesovortex) can occur within the leading edge (typically of a quasi-linear convective system (QLCS) or squall line) on rare occasion.

Supercell and tornado significance 

The wall cloud feature was first identified by Ted Fujita and as associated with tornadoes in tornadic storms following a detailed site investigation of the 1957 Fargo tornado. In the special case of a supercell thunderstorm, but also occasionally with intense multicellular thunderstorms such as the aforementioned QLCS, the wall cloud will often be seen to be rotating. A rotating wall cloud is the area of the thunderstorm that is most likely to produce tornadoes, and the vast majority of intense tornadoes.

Tornadogenesis is most likely when the wall cloud is persistent with rapid ascent and rotation. The wall cloud typically precedes tornadogenesis by ten to twenty minutes but may be as little as one minute or more than an hour. Often, the degree of ascent and rotation increase markedly shortly before tornadogenesis, and sometimes the wall cloud will descend and "bulk" or "tighten". Tornadic wall clouds tend to have strong, persistent, and warm inflow air. This should be sensible at the surface if one is in the inflow region; in the Northern Hemisphere, this is typically to the south and southeast of the wall cloud. Large tornadoes tend to come from larger, lower wall clouds closer to the back of the rain curtain (providing less visual warning time to those in the path of an organized storm).

Although it is rotating wall clouds that contain most strong tornadoes, many rotating wall clouds do not produce tornadoes. Absent the co-position of a low-level boundary with an updraft, tornadoes very rarely occur without a sufficiently buoyant rear flank downdraft (RFD), which usually manifests itself visually as a drying out of clouds, called a clear slot or notch. The RFD initiates the tornado, occludes around the mesocyclone, and when it wraps completely around, cuts off the inflow causing death of the low-level mesocyclone (or "tornado cyclone") and tornadolysis. Therefore, in most cases, the RFD is responsible for both the birth and the death of a tornado.

Usually, but not always, the dry slot occlusion is visible (assuming one's line of sight is not blocked by precipitation) throughout the tornado life cycle. The wall cloud withers and will often be gone by the time the tornado dissipates. If conditions are favorable, then, often even before the original tornado lifts, another wall cloud and occasionally a new tornado may form downwind of the old wall cloud, typically to the east or the southeast in the Northern Hemisphere (east or northeast in the Southern Hemisphere). This process is known as cyclic tornadogenesis and the resulting series of tornadoes as a tornado family.

The rotation of wall clouds is usually cyclonic; anticyclonic wall clouds may occur with anti-mesocyclones or with mesovortices on the leading edge of a QLCS (Again, this relationship is reversed in the Southern Hemisphere).

Other usages of the term 
The dense cumulonimbi cloud cover of the eyewall of an intense tropical cyclone may also be referred to as a wall cloud or eyewall cloud.

See also 
 Lifted condensation level (LCL)

References 

 Wall clouds (University of Illinois)

External links 

 

Accessory clouds
Cumulus
Severe weather and convection
Tornadogenesis
Microscale meteorology